During the 2004–05 English football season, Ipswich Town competed in the Football League Championship.

Season summary
Ipswich missed automatic promotion in the 2004–05 season, finishing third, only two points behind second-placed Wigan Athletic. Again, they lost to West Ham United in the play off semi-finals, this time by a 4–2 aggregate score.

First-team squad

Left club during season

Reserve squad

Pre-season
Ipswich traveled to Denmark for a pre-season tour in July 2004. Ipswich also played a friendly match against Newcastle United on 28 July, a testimonial match which was played in honour of former assistant manager and player Dale Roberts.

Legend

Competitions

Football League Championship

League table

Legend

Ipswich Town's score comes first

Matches

Championship play-offs

FA Cup

League Cup

Transfers

Transfers in

Loans in

Transfers out

Loans out

Squad statistics
All statistics updated as of end of season

Appearances and goals

|-
! colspan=14 style=background:#dcdcdc; text-align:center| Goalkeepers

|-
! colspan=14 style=background:#dcdcdc; text-align:center| Defenders

|-
! colspan=14 style=background:#dcdcdc; text-align:center| Midfielders

|-
! colspan=14 style=background:#dcdcdc; text-align:center| Forwards

|-
! colspan=14 style=background:#dcdcdc; text-align:center| Players transferred/loaned out during the season

Goalscorers

Clean sheets

Disciplinary record

Starting 11
Considering starts in all competitions

Awards

Player awards

Football League Championship Manager of the Month

Football League Championship Player of the Month

PFA Championship Team of the Year

References

Ipswich Town F.C. seasons
Ipswich Town F.C.